The Republic of China (Taiwan) competed in the Winter Olympic Games for the first time at the 1972 Winter Olympics in Sapporo, Japan.

Alpine skiing

Men

Men's slalom

Cross-country skiing

Men

Notes

References
Official Olympic Reports
 Olympic Winter Games 1972, full results by sports-reference.com

Nations at the 1972 Winter Olympics
1972
1972 in Taiwanese sport